Princess Adelaide Louise of Schleswig-Holstein-Sonderburg-Glücksburg (19 October 1889 – 11 June 1964) was a daughter of Friedrich Ferdinand, Duke of Schleswig-Holstein and his wife Princess Karoline Mathilde of Schleswig-Holstein-Sonderburg-Augustenburg.

She was the Princess consort of Solms-Baruth through her marriage to Friedrich, 3rd Prince of Solms-Baruth.

Early life
Princess Adelaide was born on 19 October 1889 at Grünholz Manor in Schleswig-Holstein, Prussia as the fourth eldest daughter of Frederick Ferdinand, Duke of Schleswig-Holstein-Sonderbug-Glücksburg and his wife Princess Karoline Mathilde of Schleswig-Holstein-Sonderburg-Augustenburg.

Adelaide's father was the eldest son of Friedrich, Duke of Schleswig-Holstein-Sonderburg-Glücksburg and a nephew of Christian IX of Denmark. Four years before the birth of Adelaide, he had succeeded to the headship of the House of Schleswig-Holstein-Sonderburg-Glücksburg and the title of duke upon the death of his father in 1885. Adelaide's mother was the younger sister of the German Empress.

Marriage
Adelaide married Friedrich, Hereditary Prince of Solms-Baruth (later Friedrich, 3rd Prince of Solms-Baruth), second child and eldest son of Friedrich II, Prince of Solms-Baruth and his wife Countess Luise of Hochberg on 1 August 1914 at Potsdam, Brandenburg, Prussia. Solms-Baruth was one of the many minor states of the Holy Roman Empire, located in Lower Lusatia. It had lost its independence in the German Mediatization of 1806.

Adelaide and Friedrich had five children.

Later life
On 31 December 1920, Hereditary Prince Friedrich's father died, and Friedrich became head of the house of Solms-Baruth.

Prince Friedrich died on 12 September 1951 in Windhoek, Namibia. Princess Adelaide died on 11 June 1964 in Salzburg, Salzburg, Austria.

Issue
Countess Friederike Luise of Solms-Baruth (10 October 1916 – 10 January 1989)

Countess Feodore of Solms-Baruth (5 April 1920 – 2006)
 ∞ Gert Schenk on 23 November 1942, widowed
Sebastian Schenk (born 27 August 1946)
Christian Schenk (born 18 August 1953)
 ∞ Karl-Adolf, 10th Prince of Auersperg (great-grandson of Prince Adolf of Auersperg) on 6 October 1961 at Vienna, Austria
Princess Caroline Mathilde Adelheid Gobertina of Auersperg (born 24 May 1962)

Countess Rosa Cecilie Karoline-Mathilde Irene Sibylla Anna of Solms-Baruth ( 15 May 1925 - Oct 2008)
 ∞ Neville Lewis on 3 November 1955 at Stellenbosch, South Africa, widowed
Caroline Isabelle Lewis (born 31 August 1956)
Frederick Henry Lewis (born 23 November 1961)
 ∞ Heinrich Weber on 9 October 1981 at Stellenbosch, South Africa

Friedrich, 4th Prince of Solms-Baruth (22 December 1926 – 2006)
 ∞ Baroness Birgitta of Berchem-Königsfeld on 17 August 1963 at Dabib, South West Africa
Friedrich, 5th Prince of Solms-Baruth (born 27 November 1963)
Count Julian of Solms-Baruth (born 6 August 1965)

Countess Caroline Mathilde of Solms-Baruth (15 April 1929 – 21 January 2016)
 ∞ Johann van Steenderen on 12 May 1963

Ancestry

References

Princesses of Schleswig-Holstein-Sonderburg-Glücksburg
1889 births
1964 deaths
People from the Province of Schleswig-Holstein
House of Solms-Baruth